The South African Masters was one of the most prestigious golf tournaments on the Sunshine Tour. It was last played in 2011. Before its discontinuation, it had a prize fund of 1.2 million rand and was held at the Wild Coast Sun Country Club on the KwaZulu-Natal border, South Africa.

The tournament had its roots in the South African Professional Match Play Championship, the running of which was taken over by the PGA of South Africa in 1957. Under the sponsorship of Dunlop the event transitioned into a 72-hole stroke play event in 1960.

The first edition of the new Dunlop Masters, at Houghton Golf Club in 1960, was won by Gary Player with an aggregate score of 266, a record that stood for 44 years. Player's total was equalled in 1970 by John Fourie, the only amateur to claim the title. Andrew McLardy posted 264 at the Wild Coast resort in 2004 and Darren Fichardt holds the record of 263 set on the par-70 course in 2009.

The South African Masters, along with the South African Open and the South African PGA Championship formed the Triple Crown. Winning all three titles in the same season was a feat only achieved by Gary Player and Ernie Els.

Winners

References

External links
Sunshine Tour - official site

Former Sunshine Tour events
Golf tournaments in South Africa